The Mercury Mountaineer is a mid-size luxury sport utility vehicle (SUV) that was sold by Mercury from 1996 until 2010.  Sharing many of its features with the Ford Explorer, the vehicles were virtually identical in terms of hardware. Externally, they were styled somewhat differently, and the Mountaineer was positioned with a more upscale interior, with the Mountaineer's MSRP coming in at $1,000–$6,000 more than the Explorer.  It was last redesigned for the 2006 model year with a new frame, looking very similar to its previous model.

Some controversy resulted after the media highlighted a number of rollovers involving Explorers and Mountaineers fitted with Firestone tires. The Mountaineer has been praised for its excellent handling and stability. The Mountaineer was never sold in Canada. As part of the discontinuation of the Mercury brand, production of the Mountaineer ended in late 2010.

Background 

In 1990, General Motors introduced the Oldsmobile Bravada sport-utility vehicle, derived from the four-door Chevrolet S-10 Blazer. Though far lower in price, the Bravada was marketed as a competitor to the Range Rover (and the later Land Rover Discovery) and Toyota Land Cruiser.  While sharing its body with the Blazer, Oldsmobile differentiated the Bravada with the use of model-specific trim and a dedicated all-wheel drive powertrain (in place of part-time four-wheel drive). For 1993, Jeep briefly revived the long-running Grand Wagoneer nameplate as part of the Jeep Grand Cherokee model line, using woodgrain exterior trim and a leather interior; limited sales led to its cancellation after a single model year.

As a response to the Bravada and the Grand Wagoneer, Ford introduced the 1993 Ford Explorer Limited in 1992.  In contrast to the outdoors-themed Explorer Eddie Bauer, the Limited was geared towards on-road driving; it was fitted with all-wheel drive in place of traditional four-wheel drive.  The Limited was also distinguished by monochromatic body trim, body-color bumpers, and chrome wheels.

As part of the redesign of the Explorer for 1995, the Limited remained part of the Explorer lineup, with the segment gaining additional competitors through the use of badge engineering. For 1996, the Acura SLX (Isuzu Trooper), Infiniti QX4 (Nissan Pathfinder), and the larger Lexus LX450 (Toyota Land Cruiser) were introduced together.

As these brands, along with Oldsmobile, competed more directly with luxury brands than the Ford model line, Ford Motor Company sought to develop SUVs for its Lincoln-Mercury division. To minimize model overlap, Mercury was chosen to sell a version of the mid-size Ford Explorer, while Lincoln would sell a version of the then-upcoming full-size Ford Expedition.

First generation (1997–2001)

The Mercury Mountaineer began production in April 1996 as a 1997 model. As with the Ford Explorer Limited, the Mercury Mountaineer was offered only in a four-door body configuration. After its first year, sales of the Mountaineer fell short of Lincoln-Mercury sales projections. Following several revisions in 1997 and 1998, the Mountaineer would go on to become the third-best selling vehicle in the Mercury division, behind only the Sable and the Grand Marquis.

Body 
At its launch, the Mercury Mountaineer was closest in appearance to the Ford Explorer XLT, though trimmed between the Explorer Eddie Bauer and Explorer Limited. To differentiate it from its Ford counterpart, the Mountaineer was styled with a distinct dark-gray lower body color scheme; while visually similar to the Explorer, the Mountaineer adopted the chrome waterfall grille styling of the Grand Marquis. While the taillights were model-specific, the rear hatch and bumper were shared with the European-export version of the Explorer.

As part of a 1998 model revision, the Mountaineer was given a model-specific grille and headlights, larger wheels, and a new rear hatch design.

Chassis 
The 1997-2001 Mercury Mountaineer shares the chassis of the four-door Ford Explorer, following its 1995 redesign. Though heavily based upon the first-generation Ford Ranger, the sport-utility vehicles are wider and are based on a separate wheelbase. As with the Ford Explorer, the Mountaineer is fitted with fully independent wishbone front suspension.

For 1997, the Mercury Mountaineer was fitted with a 215 hp 5.0L V8 with a 4-speed automatic transmission. For 1998, the 205 hp 4.0L V6 SOHC was offered as an option. Like the Ford Explorer, the V8 engine was mated to either rear-wheel drive or full time all-wheel drive (viscous coupling center differential); part-time four-wheel drive was unavailable with the V8 engine. The V6 Mountaineer or Explorer were offered either as rear-wheel drive or ControlTrac with "Auto", "High" and "Low" modes.

Trim 
The first-generation Mercury Mountaineer was introduced in a single trim level, offering many optional features of the Ford Explorer Eddie Bauer and Limited as standard.  For 1998, Mercury introduced a V6-engined version of the Mountaineer to expand its price range. Though including a different powertrain, Mercury chose to offer largely the same features on both versions.

Second generation (2002–2005)

The second-generation Mercury Mountaineer was introduced for the 2002 model year, redesigned alongside the five-door Ford Explorer.  Ending its chassis commonality with the Ford Ranger pickup truck, the Explorer/Mountaineer adopted a dedicated platform, introducing four-wheel independent suspension to the model lines.  Though sharing much of the same body (from the firewall rearward), designers began to give the model line an identity distinct from the Explorer.  While sharing the same roofline and doors, the Mountaineer received different front fenders, hood, front and rear bumpers, liftgate, headlamps and taillamps.  Sharing a chassis with the third-generation Ford Explorer, the Mountaineer was fitted with four-wheel independent suspension.

Previewed by a concept vehicle at the 2000 Los Angeles Auto Show, the 2002 Mercury Mountaineer marked the introduction of a new design language for the Mercury line.  The traditional Mercury silver waterfall grille was made rectangular (along with headlamps wrapping into the hood), introducing silver-trimmed taillamps and satin-silver wheels and badging.  In various forms, style elements of the 2002 Mountaineer would appear across the Mercury line during the 2000s, including the Grand Marquis, Montego, Milan, Monterey, and Mariner.

The second-generation Mountaineer carried over the 210 hp 4.0L SOHC V6 as a standard; a 239 hp 4.6L V8 (shared with the Grand Marquis) replaced the previous 5.0L V8.  A 5-speed automatic transmission was paired with both engines, with either part-time four-wheel drive or full-time all-wheel drive offered.

In contrast to the single trim level of the first generation, the second generation was expanded to a base Convenience trim (slotted between the Explorer XLT/Eddie Bauer) and a deluxe Premier trim (slotted above the Explorer Limited); the latter offered features including a rear TV/DVD player, rear ceiling air vents, chrome exhaust tip and roof rack, and body-color bumpers.

In line with other Mercury models, the Mountaineer expanded from a single trim level to a base Convenience trim and a deluxe Premier trim; slotted above the Explorer Limited, the Mountaineer Premier offered features including a rear TV/DVD player, rear ceiling air vents, chrome exhaust tip and roof rack, and body-color bumpers.

Third generation (2006–2010)

The third-generation Mercury Mountaineer was introduced for the 2006 model year, again serving as a counterpart of the Ford Explorer.  Though unchanged in wheelbase, the model line rode on an all-new chassis, gaining nearly three inches in length.  In contrast to the Explorer, the third-generation Mountaineer retained many styling elements from the previous generation, introducing clear-lens taillamps, fender-mounted turn signal repeaters, larger wheels, satin-silver trim for the sideview mirrors and bumpers; the grille and tailgate received larger Mercury emblems.

Following the discontinuation of the Lincoln Aviator, the Mountaineer again served as the premium mid-size SUV offering of the Lincoln-Mercury division.  To better differentiate the model line from the Explorer Eddie Bauer and Limited, Lincoln-Mercury upgraded the interior trim of the Mountaineer and carried over various features from the discontinued Aviator, including the option of a DVD-based navigation system with voice control (not offered on any Explorer until 2008).  As an option, the Mountaineer Premier offered power-retracting running boards (a feature adopted from the larger Lincoln Navigator, not introduced on the Explorer until 2007).

The Mountaineer carried over the 210 hp 4.0L SOHC V6 as the standard engine, introducing a 292 hp 4.6L Modular 24-valve V8 as an option (replacing the previous 16-valve version).  V6 engines were paired with a 5-speed 5R55W automatic transmission; V8 engines received an all-new 6R 6-speed automatic.

During its production, the third-generation Mountaineer saw relatively few functional changes.  For 2007, "MOUNTAINEER" badging was returned to the doors (after a four-year absence).  For 2008, side-curtain airbags were made standard.  For 2009, trailer-sway control was made standard on examples equipped for towing.  The navigation system was upgraded, including traffic flow monitoring and live updates on fuel prices from  nearby service stations.  For 2010, all trim levels received the Ford MyKey system as a standard feature; the system is a programmable security system designed for vehicles owned by multiple drivers.

Discontinuation 
For 2000, the Mountaineer was the third-best-selling Mercury (behind the Sable and Grand Marquis); ten years later, the model line had become the slowest-selling vehicle of the brand.  Following the June 2010 announcement by Ford Motor Company to shelve the Mercury brand, 2010 would be the end of Mountaineer production; the final vehicle was produced on October 1, 2010.

Unlike the Milan, Mariner, and Grand Marquis, the Mountaineer was not produced for a short 2011 model year.  While the Ford Fusion and Ford Escape has seen only detail changes for 2011 (the Ford Crown Victoria had already ended retail sales in North America), the Ford Explorer underwent a major redesign for 2011; along with several major changes to the model line, the Explorer no longer shared a body with any divisional counterparts.

Since 2020 production, Lincoln has marketed a revived Lincoln Aviator.  Though again based on the Ford Explorer, the Aviator now shares no visible body panels with its Ford counterpart.

Firestone tire controversy

In May 2000, the National Highway Traffic Safety Administration (NHTSA) contacted Ford and Firestone about the high incidence of tire failure on first generation Mercury Mountaineers, first and second generation Ford Explorers, and Mazda Navajo 3-doors fitted with Firestone tires. Ford investigated and found that several models of 15-inch (381 mm) Firestone tires (ATX, ATX II, and Wilderness AT) had very high failure rates, especially those made at Firestone's Decatur, Illinois plant.

Awards
Class Exclusive Roll Stability Control (RSC) System.
Consumers Digest Best Buy for 2006 and 2007.

Sales

References

External links

Mercury Mountaineer homepage (2006) at archive.org

Mountaineer
Flexible-fuel vehicles
Rear-wheel-drive vehicles
All-wheel-drive vehicles
Luxury sport utility vehicles
Mid-size sport utility vehicles
2000s cars
2010s cars
Cars introduced in 1996